Verkhnegaleyevo (Ürge Ğäle) is a rural locality (a village) and the administrative centre of Verkhnegaleyevsky Selsoviet, Zilairsky District, Bashkortostan, Russia. The population was 99 as of 2010. There are 3 streets.

Geography 
Verkhnegaleyevo is located 73 km southeast of Zilair (the district's administrative centre) by road. Nizhnegaleyevo is the nearest rural locality.

References 

Rural localities in Zilairsky District